Kid Eternity is a fictional character, a comic book superhero that premiered in Hit Comics #25 written by Otto Binder, drawn by Sheldon Moldoff, and published by American company Quality Comics in December 1942. All of Quality's intellectual properties were sold to DC Comics in 1956, including Kid Eternity. The character has continued to appear (albeit infrequently) in DC comic books since his revival in the 1970s.

In 1956, Everett M. "Busy" Arnold, the owner of Quality Comics decided to leave the comic business entirely for the more profitable arena of men's adventure magazines. He sold the Quality Comics line to his competitor, DC Comics. DC kept a number of Quality's titles running, but not until the 1970s did they look at the long-cancelled superhero characters (with the introduction of the Freedom Fighters). In the 1980s, Kid Eternity was folded into the Shazam series in World's Finest Comics and was revealed to be Christopher Freeman, brother of Freddie Freeman aka Captain Marvel Jr. and shared some adventures with the Marvel Family.

Kid Eternity was rebooted in 1991 by Grant Morrison with a new focus and backstory; the character has appeared sporadically since then.

Quality Comics

Prior to issue #25, Hit Comics had a series of rotating cover features, including Hercules, the Red Bee, Stormy Foster and Neon the Unknown. However, December 1942 saw the entire line-up of comics at Quality change their features (if not always the cover feature). Kid Eternity was brought in from the start as the new cover feature for Hit.

The character may have been based on the 1941 movie Here Comes Mr. Jordan, in which a prizefighter dies too soon in a plane crash and is given a new life by a celestial guide.

He proved to be popular enough that when Quality Comics began expanding their post-war line, the Kid got his own self-titled comic book, Kid Eternity, in the spring of 1946. Further illustrating the popularity of the character, his antagonists, Her Highness and Silk were given their own strip in Hit Comics #29 through #57.

By the late 1940s, however, Quality Comics was experiencing the post-war bust that most superhero comics were. In November 1949, Kid Eternity's self-titled magazine was discontinued (with issue #18) and his lead slot in Hit Comics was given over to Jeb Rivers, a riverboat captain (with issue #61).

Character origin and powers
The Kid was originally a nameless boy (who remembered being called only 'Kid' by his 'Gran'pa') who was killed when a U-boat sank his grandfather's fishing boat during World War II. Due to a supernatural mix-up, however, he was killed 75 years too soon (similar to the plot of the 1941 film Here Comes Mr. Jordan).

To rectify the error, the Kid was brought back to life for another 75 years with the mission of upholding good in the world. He was given the power to summon any good historical or mythological figure or animal by saying the word "Eternity" as well as to use the same word to make himself material or immaterial and invisible. Kid Eternity was further assisted on his duties by the clerk who'd made the error, Mr. Keeper. He is sometimes shown summoning fictional figures, like Jean Valjean or the Three Witches in Macbeth. In Kid Eternity #2 he shows time travel ability.

According to Jess Nevins' Encyclopedia of Golden Age Superheroes, "with the help of people like Sir Launcelot, Merlin and Hercules, [Kid Eternity] fights against crime, evil, the Germans, the super-strong Mr. Puny, Master Man (Satan's personal servant, who can summon history's greatest villains), and Dr. Pain, the master of agony".

Villains
 Her Highness and Silk: An elderly woman (complete with glasses and white hair) and her young, attractive assistant. Thieves and confidence scammers, the characters were humorous in nature, almost never succeeding in their plans but always willing to try another "get rich quick" scheme. Their first appearance was in Hit Comics #27 (April 1943). They were quickly spun off into their own feature; in the next issue, Her Highness was on the cover, and their spin-off lasted until issue #57. In 1982, she and Silk appeared in a Captain Marvel story guest-starring Kid Eternity (World's Finest #282).
 Master Man: Kid Eternity's opposite number, Master Man was given powers similar to the Kid's by the Devil. When Master Man said "Stygia", he could summon any evil historical or mythological figure from Stygia (first Appearance: Kid Eternity #15). When defeated he was taken back to Stygia by the ground opening beneath him, but returns later to gather more lost souls.
 Thuggoths: Evil creatures, part man, part beast, who were imprisoned in a pyramid 3000 years ago by the Egyptian pharaoh King Tut-ankh-amen, but escape and plan to take over the world, killing experts on Egyptology so it is not known how to kill them. Kid Eternity tracks them to the pyramid, is attacked by one but summons up William Tell who slays it with an arrow, and later summons up Tut, who finally destroys them with fire. He only appears in Kid Eternity #1.
 Dr. Marko: A world-renowned scientist who after being paid by foreign agents to set off radio controlled mines in a city harbour, thus killing hundreds of people, is sentenced to hanging. He decides to travel through time to attack America when it was smaller and weaker, and invents a time-globe to travel to the past, although he takes the Kid with him after they realise a mortal is meddling with Eternity, not realising who he is. Marko attempts to change history twice but is foiled. Mr. Keeper then take Marko back to the day of his execution, where he is hanged, and sends the globe far into the future, where men will learn to use its great powers. Dr. Marko appeared only in Kid Eternity #2.
 Mr. Keeper's evil brother: An evil twin brother of Mr. Keeper, who was banished to Stygia by Mr. Keeper using the Cup of Jove, for rewarding evil and punishing good, but escapes to get revenge and uses his powers to help criminals. He fights Mr. Keeper, distracting him and knocks him out, before binding him and impersonating him. He is banished once more with the Cup of Jove.
 Frank Malone: Leader of a group of kidnappers who kidnap a rich girl, called Kathryn, the Greenbriar heiress, and demand a $50,000 ransom. The Kid foils the Kidnappers, and saves the girl from a fire in the car, even though she was supposed to die that day.

DC Comics

1980s
In the early 1980s another American publisher, DC Comics, decided to revive Kid Eternity. Unlike most of the Quality stable, who were depicted as living on the parallel world Earth-X, Kid Eternity was retconned into the Marvel Family of Earth-S, which DC had acquired from another former competitor, Fawcett Comics. This change was made because the Kid's power bore such a similarity to the Marvels—after a magic word was spoken, and a character who had not been present arrived in a bolt of lightning (although unlike the Marvels, the Kid himself did not disappear). In this revival, the Kid was given a new name—Christopher "Kit" Freeman, and became the brother of Captain Marvel, Jr. (Freddy Freeman). He is shown to live in the same neighbourhood as Shazam and the Elders, Eternity.

In his first new story, he assists Captain Marvel in battling villains from American History whom Doctor Sivana has resurrected to cause trouble in Philadelphia while he prepares his plan to destroy the city. Billy Batson goes to the Pavilion, but he is seized by a thug before he can speak. He is bound and gagged and taken inside. The Kid goes there and sees Billy but is coshed by the thug. He too is bound and gagged and brought inside. He and Billy are tied back to back and placed under the Liberty Bell. Billy removes his gag using Benedict Arnold's sword as it goes through the crack. They defeat Sivana, after which the Kid returns to Eternity.

Kid Eternity became a supporting character in Shazam! stories, and there was even an eventual rematch with both Her Highness and Silk, and later Master Man. Kid Eternity's powers prove a valuable asset at least once when a villain cast a magical black void around the Marvel Family in their regular forms, thus preventing them from calling down the magic lightning to change. Although the villains also bound and gagged Kid Eternity, he managed to remove the gag to summon Zeus who supplied the magic lightning necessary for the Marvel Family to change. Earth-S was merged with Earths One, Two, 4 and X in Crisis on Infinite Earths and Kid Eternity vanished along with the original version of the Marvel Family.

1990s

In the 1990s, a different and darker version of the character was introduced. This was done with a three-issue miniseries written by Grant Morrison with art by Duncan Fegredo in 1991. This version returned the Kid to his nameless roots and severed ties with the Marvel Family. While it kept most of the original continuity intact, it also made some significant changes to the character's backstory.

When DC began their mature-readers Vertigo imprint, they went back to Kid Eternity, with a new series written by Ann Nocenti with art by Sean Phillips. This series quickly moved away from the continuity established by Morrison, and instead focused on the everyman qualities of the character. It lasted 16 issues (May 1993 – September 1994).

Revised origin
The boat captain the Kid referred to as his grandfather is actually a sexual predator who had picked up the young orphaned boy for his own purposes. The fishing ship they are on is destroyed by a U-boat and the Kid is killed. The Kid arrives at an artificial heaven created by the supernatural Lords of Chaos, who make the Kid their unwitting servant by convincing him he had been killed too early and that they would return him to life for the error.

The Kid is given the power to summon people by saying "Eternity", but the people he summons are actually demons who assume the form of the figures he desires. He can choose any person or fictional character, without regard to "good" or "evil" to bring back. The Lords of Chaos give the Kid a guide, a minor Lord of Chaos called "Mr. Keeper". Mr. Keeper, who assumes the form of a pudgy, overweight human, acts as a guide for the kid in setting up and turning on a series of "Chaos Engines", which is part of a plot by the Lords of Chaos to earn their way back into Heaven by forcing the evolution of mankind, a deed for which they feel God will forgive their past transgressions.

Kid Eternity is killed in the opening pages of JSA #1 (1999) by the sorcerer Mordru, who seeks to wipe out all agents of Order or Chaos. Sometime after, Kid Eternity later appears in JSA #48 as either a spirit within Doctor Fate's amulet or a hallucination (the story is unclear on this point).

Post-Infinite Crisis
He returns in Teen Titans #31 (2006) having been used by the newest Brother Blood to wedge open the doorway between life and death to which he was chained. This doorway appears as an actual doorway, with "life and death" written on it, as it is seen from Beast Boy's perspective and that was all his mind is able to comprehend. He returns and finally defeats Blood, who has been plaguing the Titans for some time using the souls of all the previous Brother Bloods, and is active once again.

In the pages of 52, Osiris mentions that he helped the Kid fight against the Keeper who was trying to control the dead.

In Teen Titans #68 it is revealed that at some point Kid Eternity rebelled against the Lords of Chaos and was almost stripped of his power before the intervention of a Lord of Order named Sister Sentry who offered Eternity protection. But due to Mr. Keeper almost taking his powers, Kid Eternity can now only summon one soul at a time and only for just over 1 minute, shown when he used the soul of Abraham Lincoln to get some free fast food, with the soul fading after exactly 66 seconds.

In Teen Titans #74, Kid Eternity is kidnapped by the Calculator and forced to summon the spirit of his son Marvin White repeatedly. The Calculator some time later acknowledges Kid Eternity as "burned out", without explanation. It is later indicated that he was beaten to death by the Calculator after he could not get the results he wanted from him. The Teen Titans later learn of Kid Eternity's death during a confrontation with a robotic duplicate of the Calculator, who shows them footage and pictures of his murder.

The New 52
Kid Eternity appeared in a new National Comics one-shot issue written by Jeff Lemire and drawn by Cully Hamner. His origin was revised again, thanks to the reality-warping events from 2011's Flashpoint and The New 52. Again, his name becomes Christopher Freeman, but this time he is a police coroner who gains the power to resurrect the dead.

References

External links 
Kid Eternity Profile
Kid Eternity at Don Markstein's Toonopedia.  from the original on November 17, 2015.
Titans Tower: Kid Eternity

1991 comics debuts
1993 comics debuts
Fantasy comics
Fictional characters who can turn intangible
DC Comics superheroes
DC Comics characters who use magic
DC Comics fantasy characters
Mythology in DC Comics
Quality Comics superheroes
Quality Comics titles
Vertigo Comics titles
Comics characters introduced in 1942
Captain Marvel (DC Comics)
Fictional characters with density control abilities
Fictional characters who can turn invisible
DC Comics titles
Characters created by Otto Binder
Characters created by Sheldon Moldoff
Characters created by Grant Morrison
Marvel Family